Lammidhania is an extinct genus of anthracobunids, which lived from the early to middle Eocene period. Its fossil remains were discovered in 1940 in the Chorlakki locality of the Punjab province of Pakistan.

It is the smallest known anthracobunid, and was formerly classified with proboscideans.

Cooper et al. (2014) regard most specimens referred to the genus as belonging to Anthracobune.

References 

 N.A. Wells and Philip D. Gingerich. 1983. Review of Eocene Anthracobunidae (Mammalia, Proboscidea) with a new genus and species, Jozaria palustris, from the Kuldana Formation of Kohat (Pakistan).  Contrib. Mus. Pal. Univ. Michigan 26(7): 117–139.
 Philip D. Gingerich. 1977. A small collection of fossil vertebrates from the middle Eocene Kuldana and Kohat Formations of Punjab (Pakistan). Contributions from the Museum of Paleontology, University of Michigan, 24(18): 190–203.

Fossils of Pakistan
Prehistoric odd-toed ungulates
Eocene odd-toed ungulates
Eocene genus extinctions